Radial stress is stress toward or away from the central axis of a component.

Pressure vessels
The walls of pressure vessels generally undergo triaxial loading. For cylindrical pressure vessels, the normal loads on a wall element are longitudinal stress, circumferential (hoop) stress and radial stress.

The radial stress for a thick-walled cylinder is equal and opposite to the gauge pressure on the inside surface, and zero on the outside surface. The circumferential stress and longitudinal stresses are usually much larger for pressure vessels, and so for thin-walled instances, radial stress is usually neglected.

Formula
The radial stress for a thick walled pipe at a point  from the central axis is given by

 

References

Solid mechanics